Owl Mountains Landscape Park (Park Krajobrazowy Gór Sowich) is a protected area (Landscape Park) in the Owl Mountains in south-western Poland, established in 1991, covering an area of .

The Park lies within Lower Silesian Voivodeship: in Dzierżoniów County (Gmina Dzierżoniów), Kłodzko County (Gmina Nowa Ruda), Wałbrzych County (Gmina Głuszyca, Gmina Walim) and Ząbkowice Śląskie County (Gmina Stoszowice).

External links 

Owl Mountains
Parks in Lower Silesian Voivodeship